Hot Wheels: Battle Force 5 is a 3D CGI science fiction sports animated television series created by Mattel, Nelvana Limited, and Nerd Corps Entertainment, based on the Hot Wheels toy line by the American toy maker, Mattel which was introduced in 1968. A two-episode preview aired on Cartoon Network in the United States on August 24, 2009; it was shown on Cartoon Network India starting on April 30, 2010 and on Cartoon Network Philippines from July 3, 2010. The series made its official debut on August 29, 2009. According to a HotWheels.com page as of July 14, 2010 describing "BATTLE FORCE 5 Battle Action Assortment" toys, vehicles combine forces to create even more powerful combat machines. The second season began airing September 18, 2010.

While the series does not follow nor ever referenced the events from the World Race or AcceleRacers franchises (with the exception of the character, Vert Wheeler, who appeared in both of the franchises), the series has no continuity with the toy line.

The first trailer for the series was released on the official Hot Wheels Battle Force 5 website on June 25, 2009. The first two episodes aired on Monday, August 24.

This was the fourth series to be produced by Nerd Corps Entertainment (after League of Super Evil, Storm Hawks and Dragon Booster). 52 episodes were produced.

Plot
One day driving out in the Salt Flats, expert driver Vert Wheeler comes across a dimension called a Battle Zone where he meets a life form called a Sentient named Sage. Together, they assemble a racing team equipped with state-of-the-art weaponized vehicles to compete against the robotic Sark and the animal-like Vandals in the Battle Zones for the devices that control the zones called Battle Keys to determine the fate of Earth.

Battle Force 5 lives on the planet Earth at Vert's garage/race circuit at a town called Handler's Corners. When Tornado-like portals called Storm Shocks appear, they provide access to dimensions in the Multiverse called Battle Zones. All Battle Zones have a Battle Key that allows access to the home world of the ones who accessed the Zone through Storm Shocks. This obligates Battle Force 5 to secure the Keys before the Vandals or the Sark in prevention of the Vandals looting Earth and the Sark taking over Earth.

The Battle Zones were created by the Sentients. There are two types of Sentients: Blue and Red. The two types lived on two separate Homeworlds as rivals, until the blue homeworld was taken over by the Vandals. Throughout the story, Battle Force 5 encounter situations that make them access the Vandal, Sark, and Sentient homeworlds.

At the end of the second season, the Sentient war ends, and Krytus and his team are banished. The Blue and Red Sentients are united once again. However, Rawkus informs Battle Force 5 that the Ancient Ones have awakened.

Battle Force 5 has to challenge this new threat as well as the Alpha Code, of which Zemerik is under the influence, in the feature film "Total Revolution." The Ancient Ones are revealed to be called Karmordials who created the Sentients and were banished to the Primordiverse. They use a Shadow Matter bomb to get back, but Battle Force 5 eventually stops them. To conclude the series, with the Multiverse in peace, Vert, the rest of the team, and his dad are able to return to Earth without any looming threats.

Episodes

Characters

Home media
Season 1 Volume 1 of Hot Wheels Battle Force 5 was released by Warner Home Video on DVD February 16, 2010. Volume 2 was released by Warner Home Video on DVD June 8, 2010. Season 1 Volume 3 was released on DVD December 7, 2010. Season 2 was released on DVD by Cinedigm in late 2014.

Awards
In 2010, Battle Force 5 was nominated for the Daytime Emmy Awards in Sound Editing, Sound Mixing, and Music Direction/Composition. They were recently nominated for another Emmy in Sound Editing. The Battle Force 5 marketing team also won three awards in the Web Marketing Association's 2010 Internet Advertising Competition. They won for "Best Toy & Hobby Online ad," "Best TV Online ad," "Best of Show Online ad.".

See also
Hot Wheels (1969-1971)
Heroes on Hot Wheels (1991-1992)
Hot Wheels: World Race (2003)
Hot Wheels: AcceleRacers (2005-2006)
Team Hot Wheels (2014-2017)

References

External links
 
 Activision Announces Hot Wheels: Battle Force 5 for Wii and DS
 Official Hot Wheels website

2000s American animated television series
2010s American animated television series
2009 American television series debuts
2011 American television series endings
2000s Canadian animated television series
2010s Canadian animated television series
2009 Canadian television series debuts
2013 Canadian television series endings
American computer-animated television series
Canadian computer-animated television series
Hot Wheels
Television series by Mattel Creations
Television shows based on Mattel toys
Cartoon Network original programming
Teletoon original programming
Television series by DHX Media
Television series by Nelvana
Television series about parallel universes
American children's animated action television series
American children's animated adventure television series
American children's animated science fantasy television series
American children's animated sports television series
Canadian children's animated action television series
Canadian children's animated adventure television series
Canadian children's animated science fantasy television series
Canadian children's animated sports television series
Animated television series about auto racing
English-language television shows